Hunt v. Cromartie, 526 U.S. 541 (1999), was a United States Supreme Court case regarding North Carolina's 12th congressional district.  In an earlier case, Shaw v. Reno, the Supreme Court ruled that the 12th district of North Carolina as drawn was unconstitutional because it was created for the purpose of placing African Americans in one district, thereby constituting illegal racial gerrymandering.  The Court ordered the state of North Carolina to redraw the boundaries of the district.

The redrawn 12th district boundaries were then thrown out in a summary judgment by a three judge panel in Eastern District of North Carolina. When appealed to the Supreme Court, Justice Thomas wrote for all nine justices saying that the District Court erred in granting summary judgement, while Justice Stevens concurred in an opinion indicating that he and three other justices would have upheld the 12th district as a legal partisan gerrymander. After the case was sent back down, the District Court after a three-day trial again found that the 12th district was an illegal racial gerrymander, resulting in another Supreme Court appeal and the ruling Easley v. Cromartie, . (Mike Easley replaced Jim Hunt as Governor of North Carolina, resulting in the change of name.) In Easley v. Cromartie, the Supreme Court ruled that the state was able to justify the new boundaries of the 12th district by showing that it was intended to create a safe seat for Democrats, and therefore the redrawn district was a constitutional example of political gerrymandering. Justice O'Connor acted as the swing vote, satisfied with the change in reasoning since Shaw v. Reno, despite not joining Justice Stevens' concurrence in the 1999 case.

See also
 Shaw v. Reno, 
 Easley v. Cromartie, 
 List of United States Supreme Court cases, volume 526

References

Further reading

External links
 
North Carolina Redistricting Cases: the 1990s. by the Redistricting Task Force for the National Conference of State Legislatures

American Civil Liberties Union litigation
Congressional districts of North Carolina
Legal history of North Carolina
United States electoral redistricting case law
United States equal protection case law
United States Supreme Court cases of the Rehnquist Court
1999 in United States case law
1999 in North Carolina
United States Supreme Court cases